A Soldier's Heart is a 2020 Philippine action drama television series broadcast by Kapamilya Channel. The series premiered on ABS-CBN's Primetime Bida evening block and worldwide via The Filipino Channel from January 20 to September 18, 2020, replacing The Killer Bride.

Series overview

Episodes

Season 1

Season 2

Notes

References

Lists of Philippine drama television series episodes